Ali Soheili (1896 – 1 May 1958) was a Prime Minister of Iran.

Born in Tabriz, he served as Prime Minister in 1942, and Ambassador to Britain in 1953.

He has studied at Saint Louis school in Tehran.

The Tehran Conference took place during his administration.

It is written that he was well versed in the Fine Arts (music, painting). He died of cancer at the age of 62 in London.

See also

Pahlavi dynasty
List of prime ministers of Iran

References

'Alí Rizā Awsatí (عليرضا اوسطى), Iran in the Past Three Centuries (Irān dar Se Qarn-e Goz̲ashteh – ايران در سه قرن گذشته), Volumes 1 and 2 (Paktāb Publishing – انتشارات پاکتاب, Tehran, Iran, 2003).  (Vol. 1),  (Vol. 2).

1896 births
1958 deaths
Prime Ministers of Iran
Politicians from Tabriz
Government ministers of Iran
Iranian diplomats
Deaths from cancer in England
Foreign ministers of Iran
20th-century Iranian people